Moresnetiaceae is a natural family of seed ferns in the Division Pteridospermatophyta that appears in the North American and European Devonian to Carboniferous coal measures.

Description 
Moresnetiaceae were shrubs to trees with radiospermic ovules with a lagenostome and aggregated into multiovular cupules.

References

External links 

Pteridospermatophyta
Late Devonian plants
Carboniferous plants
Prehistoric plant families
Devonian first appearances
Carboniferous extinctions
Mississippian plants
Pennsylvanian plants